Martin's Haven is a small bay in Pembrokeshire, Wales, UK, on the Dale Peninsula, with views across St Bride's Bay towards St David's. Its shingle beach has a stone slipway which acts as an embarkation point for the ferry which visits the nearby island of Skomer, a national nature reserve, during summer. Martin's Haven lies within the Skomer Marine Conservation Zone and is popular for scuba diving. Grey seals can be seen basking on the rocks. The land is owned by the National Trust.

References

Geography of Pembrokeshire
Bays of Pembrokeshire
Underwater diving sites in Wales
National Trust properties in Wales